Samuel Wright Bodman III (November 26, 1938 – September 7, 2018) was an American businessman, engineer, and politician who served as the 11th United States Secretary of Energy during the George W. Bush administration, from 2005 to 2009. He was also, at different times, the Deputy Secretary of the Treasury and the Deputy Secretary of Commerce.

In December 2004, Bodman was nominated to replace Spencer Abraham as the Energy Secretary and was confirmed unanimously by the United States Senate on January 31, 2005. During his tenure, he oversaw the security problems at Los Alamos National Laboratory and a budget in excess of $23 billion and over 100,000 federal and contractor employees.

Early life
Bodman was born on November 26, 1938, in Chicago, Illinois, the son of Lina (Lindsay) and Samuel Wright Bodman. Bodman spent his early years in the Chicago suburbs before he graduated in 1961 with a Bachelor of Chemical Engineering from Cornell University. He was a member of Alpha Sigma Phi fraternity and the Sphinx Head Society.

In 1965, he completed his Doctor of Science in chemical engineering at the Massachusetts Institute of Technology.

Career
Bodman served as an Associate Professor of Chemical Engineering at MIT and began his work in the financial sector as Technical Director of the American Research and Development Corporation, a venture capital firm.

From there, Bodman went to Fidelity Venture Associates, a division of the Fidelity Investments. In 1983 he was named President and Chief Operating Officer of Fidelity Investments and a Director of the Fidelity Group of Mutual Funds. In 1987, he joined Cabot Corporation, a Boston-based Fortune 300 company with global business activities in specialty chemicals and materials, where he served as Chairman, Chief Executive Officer, and a Director.

Bodman was a past director of M.I.T.'s School of Engineering Practice and a onetime member of the M.I.T. Commission on Education. He also was as a member of the Executive and Investment Committees at M.I.T., a member of the American Academy of Arts & Sciences, and a Trustee of the Isabella Stewart Gardner Museum and the New England Aquarium.

He was also a past director of E. I. du Pont de Nemours and Company.

Bush Administration

Bodman served as Deputy Secretary of the Treasury in the George W. Bush Administration beginning in February 2004. He also served the Bush Administration as the Deputy Secretary of Commerce beginning in 2001.

On December 10, 2004, Bodman was nominated to replace Spencer Abraham as the United States Secretary of Energy and was confirmed unanimously by the United States Senate on January 31, 2005, taking office the next day. He led the Department of Energy with a budget in excess of $23 billion and over 100,000 federal and contractor employees.

In February 2007, Bodman testified before the United States House Armed Services Subcommittee on Strategic Forces about security problems at Los Alamos National Laboratory.  He stated that "The heart of the problem is a cultural issue at Los Alamos". He asserted that the impediment to improved security was "Arrogance. Arrogance of the chemists and physicists and engineers who work at Los Alamos and think they’re above it all".

Personal life
Bodman married M. Diane (Petrella) Barber in 1997. He had three children, two stepchildren, and eight grandchildren.

Bodman died in El Paso on September 7, 2018, at the age of 79. The cause of death was reported to be complications from primary progressive aphasia. His death was announced by former President George W. Bush on the same day.

Notes

External links

General
 Samuel Bodman's political donations

Articles by Samuel Bodman
 World Energy Magazine - Meeting the Need for Affordable and Reliable Electricity
 World Energy Magazine - The New Energy Bill: Fueling America's Energy Security
 World Energy Magazine - The Global Nuclear Energy Partnership: A Roadmap to Energy Security
 World Energy Magazine - Mutual Needs Fuel Cooperative Efforts Between the United States and Africa

|-

|-

|-

1938 births
2018 deaths
21st-century American politicians
American chemical engineers
American chief executives
American chief operating officers
Businesspeople from Chicago
Cornell University College of Engineering alumni
DuPont people
George W. Bush administration cabinet members
Illinois Republicans
MIT School of Engineering alumni
Members of the United States National Academy of Engineering
Deaths from dementia in Texas
Deaths from primary progressive aphasia
Politicians from Chicago
United States Deputy Secretaries of Commerce
United States Deputy Secretaries of the Treasury
United States Secretaries of Energy
Writers from Chicago